The Transvaal dwarf chameleon (Bradypodion transvaalense) is a chameleon native to South Africa, where it is found in forested areas of Mpumalanga and Limpopo provinces. It is also known as the Wolkberg dwarf chameleon, after the Wolkberg range.

Description
They can be distinguished from their relatives in the genus by their bright colouration, with reds and oranges. They are highly territorial and relatively aggressive towards one another.

Varieties and relatives

In 2003, an ecological impact study near the village of Roossenekal, conducted by BSc Honours students (Centre for Wildlife Management at University of Pretoria) found a new variety of this dwarf chameleon. DNA research from samples collected by R.P. Zoer at the Transvaal Museum (Pretoria) revealed that it is a new variety from the Sekhukhuneland region (Bradypodion transvaalense var. sekhukhunii). A related species found in Ngome Forest, KwaZulu-Natal, is known as the Ngome dwarf chameleon (B. ngomeense).

References

 Tolley, K. and Burger, M. 2007. Chameleons of Southern Africa. .

External links
 Search for Distribution of Bradypodion transvaalense

Bradypodion
Reptiles described in 1930
Taxa named by Vivian Frederick Maynard FitzSimons